Radviliškis (Radvilishok) is a town in the Radviliškis district municipality, Šiauliai County, Lithuania.  Radviliškis has been the administrative center of the district since 1950, and is an important railway junction.

History
Radviliškis was founded at the end of the 15th century.  It was first mentioned in the book on state economics by M. Downar-Zapolsky listing the towns taxpayers in 1567. In 1687, John Sobieski, the king of Lithuania and Poland, granted the right of holding a market to it.

Radviliškis was devastated many times by military forces, plague and hunger in the 17th–19th centuries.  There were no citizens left in Radviliškis after the plague in 1708–1710.

Town growth began when the Liepāja–Romny Railway line, crossing the town, was built in 1870 and Radviliškis–Daugavpils line was built in 1873. Railwaymen constituted the majority of the residents.

Around July 12, 1941, all 300 Jews of Radviliškis were murdered in the Durpunas Forest near the Jewish cemetery by Germans and Lithuanian Activist Front members from Radviliškis.

In 1998, a sculpture of the Victory goddess Nike was unveiled in the center of Radviliškis to commemorate the eightieth anniversary of the victory over the united German–Russian West Russian Volunteer Army. It was created by sculptor P. Mazuras.

Name and coat of arms
Supposedly, the name originated from the name of the noble Radziwiłł   (Radvila) family of Lithuanian origin. This family ruled Radviliškis for more than 200 years, from 1546 to 1764.

A rising and light-emitting horse, representing communication, motion, town development and flourishing, is depicted in the coat of arms of Radviliškis. The light is a symbol of civilization's role in the town development. It was created by artist Laima Ramonienė in 1992.

Attractions
Radviliškis, settled on everglades, was famous for its railway and black-from-locomotive-smoke sparrows.

The two symbols of the town are the railways, and black swallows.

There are Evangelical-reformed, Protestant, Lutheran, and Orthodox chapels, Jewish synagogues and Catholic Churches in Radviliškis.

The stone windmill of Radviliškis was erected in remembrance of the violent and triumphant battles in 1919 against the German–Russian armed forces(Bermontians).

The wooden belfry of Radviliškis parish's Blessed Virgin Mary church of the Immaculate Conception is a topical architecture monument.  It was set in 1878.  The belfry burned twice. It was reconstructed in 1984.

Twin towns – sister cities

Radviliškis is twinned with:

 Bauska, Latvia
 Daliyat al-Karmel, Israel
 Gniezno, Poland
 Grodzisk Mazowiecki, Poland
 Horki, Belarus
 Kadzidło, Poland
 Khashuri, Georgia
 Lillehammer, Norway
 Minsk District, Belarus
 Nyasvizh, Belarus
 Saint-Seine-l'Abbaye, France
 Skara, Sweden
 Uman, Ukraine

References

External links

Official website
Feasibility and EIA study for Radviliskis WWTP

 
Cities in Šiauliai County
Cities in Lithuania
Municipalities administrative centres of Lithuania
Shavelsky Uyezd
Holocaust locations in Lithuania
Radviliškis District Municipality